Washington's 22nd legislative district is one of forty-nine districts in Washington state for representation in the state legislature.

The district includes the state capital Olympia and areas surrounding it, such as Lacey and Tumwater.

The district's legislators are state senator Sam Hunt and state representatives Beth Doglio (position 1) and Jessica Bateman (position 2), all Democrats.

See also
Washington Redistricting Commission
Washington State Legislature
Washington State Senate
Washington House of Representatives

References

External links
Washington State Redistricting Commission
Washington House of Representatives
Map of Legislative Districts

22